BAE Systems Submarines, is a wholly owned subsidiary of BAE Systems, based in Barrow-in-Furness, Cumbria, England, and is responsible for the development and production of submarines.

History

The Barrow-in-Furness shipyard has been building submarines since  was launched for the Ottoman Navy in 1886 and the s for the Royal Navy were launched in 1901. The shipyard was formerly operated by Vickers Shipbuilding and Engineering (VSEL). Upon the creation of BAE Systems in 1999, the submarine division became part of BAE Systems Marine. As part of BAE Systems Marine, the yard constructed surface ships, such as the s. In 2003, the company was split into BAE Systems Submarines and BAE Systems Naval Ships, with Barrow ceasing surface ship construction.  Following a 2012 restructuring, BAE Systems Submarines became part of BAE Systems Maritime & Land UK, alongside BAE Systems Maritime Services and BAE Systems Naval Ships.

Since its completion in 1986, submarines at Barrow are constructed inside the Devonshire Dock Hall (DDH).  In addition to the main shipyard in Barrow-in-Furness, BAE Systems Submarines also operates from sites at Farnborough, Ash Vale, Frimley and Weymouth.

The company is currently constructing the s, a new generation nuclear attack submarine (SSN) for the Royal Navy, the first of which was launched on 8 June 2007. The order for the initial batch of three submarines was placed in 1997, with Marconi Marine (VSEL), which was absorbed into BAE Systems in 1999.  Construction of the final Astute-class began in May 2018 and all seven Astute boats are scheduled to be completed by the end of 2026.  BAE Systems Submarines is also building four  ballistic missile submarines, which will carry the UK's Strategic Nuclear Deterrent. Construction started in late 2016 and the first submarine is expected to enter service in the early 2030s.

See also
 Port of Barrow
 List of ships and submarines built in Barrow-in-Furness

Notes

References

External links
BAE Systems: Murray Easton Interview
Naval Shipbuilding - North West England

 
BAE Systems facilities
Companies based in Barrow-in-Furness
Shipbuilding companies of England
Trident (UK nuclear programme)
BAE Systems subsidiaries and divisions
2003 establishments in England
British Shipbuilders